Jelena Vucetic Vučetić (born 14 September 1993) is a Montenegrin basketball player.

Honours
Vojvodina
 National Cup of Serbia (1): 2014-15

External links
Profile at eurobasket.com

1993 births
Living people
Serbs of Montenegro
People from Kotor
Montenegrin women's basketball players
Point guards
Shooting guards
ŽKK Partizan players
ŽKK Vojvodina players
Montenegrin expatriate basketball people in Hungary
Montenegrin expatriate basketball people in Russia
Montenegrin expatriate basketball people in Serbia